Jack Cannon may refer to:
 Nelson DeMille (born 1943), American author who used the pseudonym Jack Cannon
 Jack Cannon (American football) (1907–1967), American football player
 Jack Cannon, protagonist of a popular children's book series written by a patient in the American medical drama House

See also
John Cannon (disambiguation)